Morunglav is a commune in Olt County, Oltenia, Romania. It is composed of five villages: Bărăști, Ghioșani, Morunești, Morunglav, and Poiana Mare.

Natives
 Constantin Dumitrescu (1868–1935), major general

References

Communes in Olt County
Localities in Oltenia
Place names of Slavic origin in Romania